Zeitoun, Zeytoun, Żejtun, Zaytoun, Zeitun, Zitouna, "Zetum" or Zeita (all derived from the Arabic word for "olive tree") may refer to:

People 
 Abdullah Abu Zaitoun, Jordanian footballer
 Mohammed Dib Zaitoun, Syrian politician and army general
 Ariel Zeitoun (born 1945), French film director and producer
 Oren Zeitouni, Israeli former professional association football player
 Nassif Zeytoun, Syrian singer

Places

Armenia
 Kanaker-Zeytun District, a district in Yerevan, the capital of Armenia
 Nor Zeytun, a town in this district

Iran
 Zeytun, Jahrom, Fars Province
 Zeytun, Rostam, Fars Province
 Zeytun, Kohgiluyeh and Boyer-Ahmad
 Zeytun-e Sofla, Kohgiluyeh and Boyer-Ahmad

Malta
 Żejtun
 Għajn Żejtuna, an area in the town of Mellieħa

Palestine
 Zaytun Quarter, a quarter of Gaza's Old City
 Zeitoun, Gaza, a district of Gaza City
 Zeita (disambiguation), various towns called Zeita or Zeyta in the West Bank
 Ein al-Zeitun, a depopulated village in Palestine

Other places
 Zitouna, El Taref, a district in Skikda Province, Algeria
 Zaytun or Zaitun, former names of the Chinese city of Quanzhou
 Zeitoun, Cairo, also El-Zeitoun, a district of Cairo, Egypt
 Zetounion, a former name of the Greek city Lamia
 Zeytun, a former name of Süleymanlı, Kahramanmaraş Province, Turkey

Other uses 
 Zeitoun (book), a 2009 nonfiction book by Dave Eggers
 Abdulrahman Zeitoun, the main character in the book
 Zaytoun (film), an Israeli film
 Zaytoun (organisation), a non-profit organisation marketing Palestinian olive oil products

See also 
 Zeitun Resistance (disambiguation), resistance by Armenian militia in Süleymanlı